The Austrian State Treaty or Austrian Independence Treaty re-established Austria as a sovereign state. It was signed on 15 May 1955 in Vienna, at the Schloss Belvedere among the Allied occupying powers (France, the United Kingdom, the United States, and the Soviet Union) and the Austrian government. The neighbouring Federal People's Republic of Yugoslavia acceded to the treaty subsequently. It officially came into force on 27 July 1955.

Its full title is "Treaty for the re-establishment of an independent and democratic Austria, signed in Vienna on 15 May 1955".

Generalities and structure
The treaty re-established a free, sovereign and democratic Austria. The basis for the treaty was the Moscow Declaration of 30 October 1943. The agreement and its annexes provided for Soviet oilfield concessions and property rights of oil refineries in Eastern Austria and the transfer of the assets of the Danube Shipping Company to the USSR.

Treaty signatories
Allied foreign ministers:
Vyacheslav Molotov (Soviet Union), 
John Foster Dulles (United States), 
Harold Macmillan (United Kingdom) 
 Antoine Pinay (France)  
High commissioners of the occupying powers: 
Ivan I. Ilitchov (Soviet Union)
Geoffrey Wallinger (United Kingdom)
Llewellyn E. Thompson Jr. (United States)
Roger Lalouette (France).
Austrian foreign minister:
Leopold Figl

Nine parts of the treaty
 Preamble
 Political and territorial provisions
 Military and air travel provisions
 Reparations
 Ownership, Law and Interests
 Economic relations
 Rules for disputes
 Economic provisions
 Final provisions

Development
First attempts to negotiate a treaty were made by the first post-war government. However, they failed because the Allies wanted to see a peace treaty with Germany first. A treaty became less likely with the development of the Cold War. However, Austria successfully held its part of Carinthia against the demands of a resurgent Federal People's Republic of Yugoslavia, even though the issue of potential reunification with South Tyrol, annexed by Italy from Austria-Hungary in 1919, was not addressed. The climate for negotiations improved with Joseph Stalin's death in 1953, and negotiations with the Soviet foreign minister, Molotov, secured the breakthrough in February 1955.

Important points in the treaty

As well as general regulations and recognition of the Austrian state, the minority rights of the Slovene and Croat minorities were also expressly detailed. Anschluss (Austria's political union with Germany), as had happened in 1938, was forbidden (German recognition of Austria's sovereignty and independence and renunciation by Germany of territorial claims over Austria were later covered in general terms in the 1990 Treaty on the Final Settlement with Respect to Germany about existing borders, but not specifically). Nazi and fascist organisations were prohibited.

Austrian neutrality is actually not in the original text of the treaty but was declared by parliament on 26 October 1955, after the last Allied troops were to leave Austria according to the treaty.

Result
As a result of the treaty the Allies left Austrian territory on 25 October 1955. 26 October came to be celebrated as a national holiday (called the Day of the Flag until 1965). It is sometimes thought to commemorate the withdrawal of Allied troops, but in fact celebrates Austria's Declaration of Neutrality, which was passed on 26 October 1955.

See also
Allied-administered Austria
Austrian Army

Samuel Reber

References

External links
Full Text of the Treaty
www.staatsvertrag.at - an acoustic web exhibition on the "Austrian Independence Treaty" 
Federal Chancellor Leopold Figl exhibits the freshly signed State Treaty document to the waiting crowd (Video) 
Austria is free 
Website of the 2005 Jubilee Year
Counter-website to the 2005 national celebrations 

Independence Treaty
Allied occupation of Austria
Anti-fascist works
Treaties of the Soviet Union
1955 in Austria
Austria–Soviet Union relations
Treaties concluded in 1955
Treaties entered into force in 1955
Treaties of Austria
Austria–United States relations
Treaties of the United Kingdom
Treaties of the French Fourth Republic
Treaties of the United States
May 1955 events in Europe
1950s in Vienna
Cold War treaties
Harold Macmillan